The Men's 2006 European Amateur Boxing Championships were held in Plovdiv, Bulgaria from July 13 to July 23. The 36th edition of this bi-annual competition was organised by the European governing body for amateur boxing, EABA.

Medal winners

Medal table

External links
Results
EABA Boxing

European Amateur Boxing Championships
European Amateur Boxing Championships, 2006
European Amateur Boxing Championships
Boxing
Sport in Plovdiv
July 2006 sports events in Europe